The China Railways LD1 class steam locomotive was a class of streamlined 4-4-4T tank steam locomotives for passenger trains operated by the China Railway. They were originally built for the South Manchuria Railway (Mantetsu) in 1936. The "Dabu" name came from the English "double-ender", which was used by Mantetsu for all tank locomotives.

History

After the failure of the  power car of the Jiha1 class 4-part diesel-electric trainset in 1935, Mantetsu decided to build a locomotive for high-speed, short-distance trains. The result was the Dabusa (ダブサ) class 4-4-4T locomotives, though they were originally designed with a 4-4-6T wheel arrangement.

Mantetsu intended to build steam locomotives for high speed passenger trains in the future, and to be competitive with the high speeds attained by diesel trainsets, they needed to be safely operated continuously over long distances. To this end, all bearings were roller bearings from SKF of Sweden to reduce fuel consumption, and the locomotive was designed to make inspection and maintenance as simple as possible, and to maximise the time between maintenance intervals. In addition, the introduction of technically advanced steam locomotives to replace internal-combustion railcars also took into consideration the potential for petroleum shortages in case of war. The streamlining was designed in cooperation with the Kawanishi Aircraft Company at the same time as the streamlining for the Pashina class locomotive Pashina-12 was designed.

Two were built as a trial production in 1936, using special steel to reduce weight as much as possible. A Schmidt type E superheater and a feedwater heater were fitted. Though normally operating on coal, a heavy oil combustion device was fitted to allow the use of shale oil as fuel. However, when tests with shale oil from the Fushun Coal Mine were conducted, it was found that the temperature in the firebox rose too high, causing a failure, and the idea was abandoned. As they proved less successful than hoped, they ended up being used mainly on ordinary passenger trains on the Dalian–Wafangdian and Dashiqiao–Fengtian sections of Mantetsu's Dalian–Xinjing mainline.

Similar in physical appearance to the Class 242 streamlined 4-4-4T tank locomotives of the Hungarian State Railways, they were painted in a purple and cream livery inspired by the German Class 61 streamlined tank locomotives.

Originally numbered ダブサ500 and ダブサ501, under the new unified classification system introduced in 1938, they became ダブサ1 and ダブサ2.

Postwar
At the end of the Second Sino-Japanese War, one was assigned to the Dalian depot, while the second was assigned to the Fengtian Railway Bureau; both were passed on to the Republic of China Railway. After the establishment of the People's Republic and the current China Railway, they were designated class ㄌㄉ一 (LD1) in 1951, becoming class LD1 (written in Pinyin instead of Zhuyin) in 1959.

See also 

 DRG Class 61 and LBE Nos. 1 to 3  German streamlined tank locomotives, of similar age and purpose.
 Hungarian MÁV Class 242

References

4-4-4T locomotives
Kawasaki locomotives
Railway locomotives introduced in 1936
Steam locomotives of China
Standard gauge locomotives of China
Rolling stock of Manchukuo
Streamlined steam locomotives
Passenger locomotives